Radio Next 93.2 FM is a Bangladeshi private radio station. The radio launched on 6 May 2015 and it was available in all parts of Dhaka, Bangladesh. But this radio has been defunct without any announcement (≈ 9 October 2019).  The station broadcasts from 8 am to midnight. Its brand new slogan "The Happiest Radio On Earth" has been a part of re-branding on the occasion of its third anniversary in 2018. Since its inception, Radio Next previously used the tagline "More
Music, More Fun!"

Despite of only being aired within the capital city of Dhaka, listeners can hear programs though online platforms. Radio Next is owned and run by Nitol–Niloy group. Currently Radio Next 93.2 FM is being broadcast only in Dhaka and it is available worldwide through its mobile application and many different third party online platforms. Radio Next 93.2 is generally a music and show based radio station. The first radio station to do live shows on Facebook along with the radio. Radio Next 93.2 FM is the first radio station to implement and run online live visual sessions of their shows.

Programs

Regular shows
 The RJ Farhan Show (RJ Farhan)
 Evening (RJ Armeen)
 LOL (RJ Aongon)
 Midday Madness (RJ VXL)
 Breakfast Beat (RJ Shantu)

Weekend shows
 Euphoria (RJ Ahona)
 Global Grooves (RJ Nahiyan)
 Bhalobasha (RJ Kumkum)
 Listener's Diary (RJ Farhan)
 (RJ Armeen)
 Double A Battery (RJ Abonee & RJ Aongon)
 (RJ Kumkum)

Celebrity show
 Friendz Uncut (Tamim Mridha & Shouvik Ahmed)

References

2015 establishments in Bangladesh
Organisations based in Dhaka
Radio stations in Bangladesh
Mass media in Dhaka